Bruno Cirino (25 October 1936 – 17 April 1981) was an Italian actor and stage director.

Life and career 
Born Bruno Cirino Pomicino in Naples, Cirino abandoned his studies in law to enroll the Silvio d’Amico Academy of Dramatic Arts in Rome. After graduating, in 1961 he started his career on stage, notably working with Franco Zeffirelli, Eduardo De Filippo, Giorgio De Lullo and Orazio Costa. In the 1970s he founded the theatrical company Teatroggi, also serving as a stage director. Starting from the late 1960s Cirino was also active in films and on television, particularly getting a large critical acclaim for his performance in Vittorio De Seta's Diary of a Schoolteacher (1972). He died prematurely at the age of 44, after suffering a heart attack while he was driving his car on the way back from a theatrical tour.

Partial filmography 

For the Love of Mariastella (1946) - Il trapanese
Difficult Years (1948) - Sebastiano Caputo (uncredited)
In the Name of the Law (1949) - (uncredited)
The Unforgiven (1950) - Turi'
Il Brigante Musolino (1950)
The Crossroads (1951) - Aldrighi
Carcerato (1951)
Cameriera bella presenza offresi... (1951) - Il medico della seduta spiritica (uncredited)
Appointment for Murder (1951) - Palermo
Lorenzaccio (1951)
Torment of the Past (1952) - Padrone del barcone
Ergastolo (1952) - Pasquale Amitrano
The Bandit of Tacca Del Lupo (1952) - Sindaco Lo Cascio
The Secret of Three Points (1952) - Santi Mancuso
Fratelli d'Italia (1952) - Presidente del tribunale austriaco
La carovana del peccato (1953) - Giuseppe
Saluti e baci (1953) - Il sindaco (uncredited)
Buon viaggio, pover'uomo! (1953) - Commissario di Milano
Of Life and Love (1954) - Don Lollò (segment "La giara")

References

External links 

 

1936 births
1981 deaths
20th-century Italian male actors
Italian male film actors
Italian male television actors
Italian male stage actors
Theatre people from Naples
Accademia Nazionale di Arte Drammatica Silvio D'Amico alumni
Male actors from Naples